Consumer Credit Act may refer to:
Consumer Credit Act 1974
Consumer Credit Act 2006
Consumer Credit Protection Act